LTE may refer to:

Science, technology and mathematics
 LTE (telecommunication) (Long-Term Evolution), a mobile telephony standard
 LTE Advanced, an enhancement
 LTE Advanced Pro
 Compaq LTE, a line of laptop computers
 Leukotrienes, immune biochemicals
 Lifting-the-exponent lemma, in number theory, formulae for p-adic valuation
 Local thermodynamic equilibrium, in physics

Transport
 LTE International Airways, a 1987–2008 Spanish charter airline
 Lam Tei stop, Hong Kong (by MTR station code)
 London Transport Executive, the 1948–1962 organisation responsible for public transport in Greater London
 London Transport Executive (GLC), the 1970–1984 public transport executive agency within the Greater London Council
 Loss of tail-rotor effectiveness, an event in helicopter flight

Other uses
 Letter to the editor, in periodicals
 Liquid Tension Experiment, a progressive metal supergroup
 London Tests of English, an ESOL examination